Pilea crassifolia is a plant native to Central and South America.  One well-known cultivar, grown for its colorful foliage, is P. crassifolia 'Moon Valley'.

References

External links
Photo of Moon Valley cultivar from Garden Breizh

crassifolia